Acholi Inn is a hotel in Gulu, the largest city in Northern Uganda.

Location
The coordinates of Acholi Inn are:2°46'53.0"N, 32°17'52.0"E (Latitude:2.781389; Longitude:32.297778).

History
The hotel was built during Uganda's colonial era and was commissioned by the British in 1936. At Independence in 1962, it was one of about a dozen hotels that constituted Uganda Hotels Limited, a government parastatal during the Obote I regime. In 1995, the hotel was privatized and has undergone refurbishment.

Ownership
, Acholi Inn is privately owned, and detailed shareholding in the establishment is not publicly known.

Amenities
Acholi Inn has 120 regular rooms, 12 VIP suites, a swimming pool, a health club, a gymnasium, a sauna, a steam bath, and a massage parlour. Its main conference room can accommodate up to 1,000 guests. It also has an Internet café, a restaurant, a cocktail bar, satellite television and air conditioning.

See also

References

External links

Hotels in Uganda
Hotels in Gulu
Gulu District